Apti Isayevich Aushev (born 15 January 1985) is a Russian former professional football player.

Club career
He played two seasons in the Russian Football National League for FC Angusht Nazran.

Personal life
He is the older brother of Khavazh Aushev.

External links
 
 

1985 births
Living people
Ingush people
Russian footballers
Association football defenders
FC Angusht Nazran players